Wola-Sosenka  is a settlement in the administrative district of Gmina Kwidzyn, within Kwidzyn County, Pomeranian Voivodeship, in northern Poland.

For the history of the region, see History of Pomerania.

The settlement has a population of 16.

References

Wola-Sosenka